Hong Khaou (born 22 October 1975) is a Cambodian-born Chinese, British film director and screenwriter. He is best known for his debut feature film Lilting and the short films Summer and Spring.

Early life

Khaou was born in Cambodia to Chinese-Cambodian parents. He was a few months old when he and his family fled to Vietnam after the Fall of Phnom Penh to the Khmer Rouge. When he was 8 years old, his family migrated to the United Kingdom in the 1980s as political refugees.

Education

Khaou studied BA (Hons) Film Production at the University for the Creative Arts (UCA) in Farnham, formerly the Surrey Institute of Art & Design, graduating in 1997.

Films

His debut feature film Lilting was produced under the Film London micro-budget scheme Microwave, and was released on 8 August in the United Kingdom by distributors Artificial Eye. His short film Spring played at both the Sundance Film Festival, and the Berlin International Film Festival in 2011, with his previous short Summer also having premiered at Berlin in 2006. He is the recipient of the 2014 Sundance Institute/Mahindra Global Filmmaking Award for his upcoming feature film Monsoon.

Filmography

Short films
 2005 : Waiting for Movement
 2006 : Summer
 2011 : Spring

Feature film 
 2014 : Lilting
 2019: Monsoon

References

External links 
 

1975 births
Alumni of the University for the Creative Arts
British film directors
British people of Chinese descent
British people of Southeast Asian descent
Cambodian film directors
Cambodian people of Chinese descent
Cambodian refugees
European people of Cambodian descent
Living people
Refugees in the United Kingdom
Sundance Film Festival award winners
LGBT film directors